K. Appukuttan Nair (1925–2007), better known as Kozhikodan, was a film critic and writer from Kerala, India. He began writing on films from the early 1950s. He started writing in Mathrubhumi and Chandrika, and later became a regular columnist of Mathrubhumi Illustrated Weekly along with Cynic and Nadirsha (T. M. P. Nedungadi). Kozhikodan received the Kerala State Film Award for Best Book on Cinema in 1988 for Chalathitraswadanam Engane? and the Kerala Sahitya Akademi Award (Humour) in 2010 for the poetry collection Padachonikku Salam. He died on 20 January 2007.

'Kozhikodan Smaraka Samiti' has instituted Kozhikodan Puraskaram, an award given annually to the best book on cinema in Malayalam.

Works

Cinema
 Chalachitra Sallapam (DC Books, 1982)
 Chalachitra Niroopanam (NBS, 1984)
 Chalachitra Jalakom (Mathrubhumi,1985)
 Chalachitraswadanam Engane (PK Brothers, 1988)
 Sathyan Enna Natan (NBS, 1992)
 Malayala Cinema: Ente Premabhajanam (Poorna, 1999)
 Malayala Cinemayile Ekkalatheyum Ettavum Mikacha Pathu Chithrangal (Poorna, 2001)

Essays
 Navollekham (1966)
 Mahanaya Shikari (1973)
 Eshani Puranam (1988)

Humour
 Padachonikk Salaam (1998)

Children's literature
 Vado Njanum Koode Varaam (1986)
 Vadamalliyum Panineer Poovum (1992)
 Mahacharithamala – Two volumes (1983)
 Kuttikalkkoru Sammanam (2000)

Selection
Kozhikodan lists the following ten films as the best ever in Malayalam cinema in one of his books.

 Swayamvaram (1972)
 Yavanika (1982)
 Sandhya Mayangum Neram (1983)
 Njan Gandharvan (1991)
 Vasthuhara (1991)
 Vembanad (1991)
 Aparahnam (1991)
 Kadavu (1991)
 Thenmavin Kombathu (1994)
 Ormakal Undayirikkanam (1995)

References

External links
C. S. Venkiteswaran remembering Kozhikodan

1925 births
2007 deaths
Indian film critics
Malayali people
People from Palakkad district
Novelists from Kerala
Malayalam-language writers
Recipients of the Kerala Sahitya Akademi Award
Kerala State Film Award winners
20th-century Indian dramatists and playwrights
20th-century Indian essayists
20th-century Indian novelists
Indian children's writers
Dramatists and playwrights from Kerala
20th-century Indian male writers